The Grapes is a Grade II listed public house at 39 Fairfield Street, Wandsworth, London, England.

It was built in the early–mid-19th century.

References

External links
 

Pubs in the London Borough of Wandsworth
Grade II listed buildings in the London Borough of Wandsworth
Grade II listed pubs in London